The Roman Bética Route is an ancient Roman road that passes through fourteen cities of the provinces of Seville, Cadiz, and Cordova in Spain. It runs through the southern part of the Roman province of Hispania and includes territories also traversed by the Via Augusta. On this route are landscapes of geographic and natural interest such as the Natural Park of the Cordovan Subbética, the Bahía de Cádiz Natural Park, and the Valley of the Guadalquivir.

Cities on the route 
 Santiponce
 Carmona
 La Luisiana
 Écija
 Almodóvar del Río
 Córdoba
 Montoro
 Almedinilla
 Puente Genil
 Osuna
 Marchena
 Jerez de la Frontera
 Tarifa
 Cádiz

External links 
 Ruta Bética Romana (in Spanish)

Roman sites in Spain
Cultural tourism in Spain